Esterwegen is a municipality in the Emsland district, in Lower Saxony, Germany.

Geography

Demographics
In 2015 the population was 5,280.

Government
The mayor is Hermann Willenborg.

Concentration camp

In 1933 a concentration camp was established in Esterwegen. In 1936 the camp was dissolved and used till 1945 as a prisoner camp, for political prisoners and later for prisoners of the decree Nacht und Nebel.

Notable inmates 

 Julius Leber, politician 
 Carl von Ossietzky, journalist and Nobel Peace Prize Laureate
 Georg Diederichs, later Minister-President of Lower Saxony
 Karl Germer, Outer Head of the Order (OHO) of Ordo Templi Orientis

Notes

External links 

 memorial of Camp Esterwegen and the other 14 Emsland camps (in German, English, Dutch, French)
 :de:KZ Esterwegen
 homepage of the memorial (in German)
 United States Holocaust Memorial Museum - Concentration Camps, 1933-1939

Emsland

no:Esterwegen